The 1982 Nicholls State Colonels football team represented Nicholls State University as an independent during the 1982 NCAA Division I-AA football season. Led by second-year head coach Sonny Jackson, the Colonels compiled a record of 7–4. Nicholls State played home games at John L. Guidry Stadium in Thibodaux, Louisiana.

Schedule

References

Nicholls State
Nicholls Colonels football seasons
Nicholls State Colonels football